The 394th Infantry Regiment was established on 23 July 1918 as the 394th Infantry and assigned to the 99th Division as a member of the National Army. It was demobilized on 30 November 1918, but was later reconstituted on 21 June 1921 as a member of the Organized Reserves just like the 99th Infantry Division. The regiment's headquarters was established at Pittsburgh, PA.

History
During World War II the 394th Infantry Regiment was called to active duty on 15 November 1942 and reorganized at Camp Van Dorn, Miss. During 1943-44, the 394th trained at various camps and maneuvers in the southern part of the US. 

The 394th arrived at Camp Miles Standish, Mass. in mid-September and within two weeks the regiment made its way onto transport ships to England. 

Between mid-October and early November the 394th was in Dorset, England before arriving on 6 November 1944 in Le Havre, France. The 394th engaged in a variety of campaigns, including the Battle of the Bulge and the Ardennes Forest, Remagen Bridge, the Rhineland, and the Ruhr.

The 394th was inactivated on 29 September 1945 at Camp Patrick Henry, Va. 

On 29 October 1998, the 394th Infantry Regiment was reactivated and renamed the 1st Battalion, 394th Regiment, and assigned to the 75th Division, a training support division in the United States Army Reserve.

Intelligence and Reconnaissance Platoon 

The 394th Infantry Regiment's Intelligence and Reconnaissance Platoon under the command of Lieutenant Lyle Bouck became the most decorated American unit of World War II due to the actions of the eighteen men of the platoon while fighting  in the Battle of Lanzerath Ridge during the Battle of the Bulge. The platoon was recognized with Presidential Unit Citation Order No. 26 in 1981.

A memorial plaque is mounted on a stone at the N626 at the infamous WW2 Losheimergraben crossroads. Four members (including Bouck) received the Distinguished Service Cross, five the Silver Star, and nine the Bronze Star with V device. Additionally, every member of a four-man artillery observation team which joined their defense received the Distinguished Service Cross.

References

United States Army Center of Military History. 394th Regiment. Web.  retrieved 22 December 2013.
 United States The Institute of Heraldry. 394th Regiment Distinctive Unit Insignia and Coat of Arms. Web. Services retrieved 22 December 2013.
"Time Line of 394th from Nov. 15, 1942 to May 9, 1945." 99th Division Battlebabies. N.p.. Web. . retrieved 22 December 2013.

394
United States Army in World War II
Military units and formations established in 1918
1918 establishments in the United States